Sierre/Siders railway station is a railway station in the municipality of Sierre, in the Swiss canton of Valais. It is an intermediate stop on the Simplon line and is served by local and long-distance trains.

The base station of Funiculaire Sierre–Montana–Crans, the funicular to Crans-Montana, is located nearby at Rue du Pradec,

Services 
The following services stop at Sierre/Siders:

References

External links 
 
 
 

Railway stations in the canton of Valais
Swiss Federal Railways stations